Viqueque is a city in the south-east of East Timor, 183 km from Dili, the national capital. Viqueque is the capital of Viqueque Municipality and Viqueque Administrative Post, and has five sucos under its control. They are: Uatu-Lari, Uatu-Carbau, Viqueque, Lacluta and Ossu. The city has a population of 6,859 (2015), the administrative post has 20,640 (2004), the municipality 65,245 inhabitants (2004).

References 

Populated places in East Timor
Viqueque Municipality